Rohan Rangarajan (born 28 June 1999) is a Singaporean cricketer who currently plays for the Singapore national cricket team.

Rohan is a right-hand opening batsman and a right arm off break bowler. Rohan has been playing for his country beginning at junior levels in 2011. He played for the Singapore national under-19 cricket team during the 2016 Under-19 Asia Cup, where Singapore placed fourth in their group. Prior to the Under-19 Asia Cup, the Singapore National Under-19 team participated in the 2016 ICC Under-19 Cricket World Cup Asia Qualifier Division Two where they placed second, losing to Malaysia Under-19 in the finals by 6 wickets. Rohan was named the player of the series, scoring 290 runs at an average of 72.50, with 31 fours and 7 sixes, and picking up 13 wickets at an average of 10.76 and an economy of 2.80.

In May 2017, he played for Singapore in the 2017 ICC World Cricket League Division Three against Uganda and Canada.

In August 2018, he was named in Singapore's squad for the 2018 Asia Cup Qualifier tournament. In October 2018, he was named in Singapore's squad for the 2018 ICC World Cricket League Division Three tournament in Oman.

In July 2019, he was named in Singapore's Twenty20 International (T20I) squad for the Regional Finals of the 2018–19 ICC T20 World Cup Asia Qualifier tournament. He made his T20I debut for Singapore against Qatar on 22 July 2019.

In September 2019, he was named in Singapore's squad for the 2019 Malaysia Cricket World Cup Challenge League A tournament. He made his List A debut for Singapore, against Qatar, in the Cricket World Cup Challenge League A tournament on 17 September 2019. In October 2019, he was named in Singapore's squad for the 2019 ICC T20 World Cup Qualifier tournament in the United Arab Emirates.

References

External links
 
 

1999 births
Living people
Singaporean cricketers
Singapore Twenty20 International cricketers
Singaporean people of Tamil descent
Singaporean sportspeople of Indian descent
Singaporean sportsmen